Nordberg Manufacturing Company was a manufacturer of steam engines, large diesel engines, pumps, hoists and compressors for the mining and quarry industries located in Milwaukee, Wisconsin.

History 

The company was founded by Bruno V. Nordberg and Jacob Elias Friend in 1886 in Milwaukee. Nordberg had previously been working at steam engine and sawmill maker E. P. Allis & Co. Friend became the company's president, and later his son, Robert E. Friend, was president and chief executive officer.

In 1917, Bruno Nordberg designed and built the world's largest steam hoist bought by Quincy Mining Company for their copper mine near Hancock, Michigan. It is a cross compound steam hoist and was installed and up and running in November 1920 and used for 11 years. It is currently available for guided historical tours.

Nordberg produced a number of marine triple-expansion steam engines for ships built under the United States Shipping Board program, ca. 1918-1920:

Diameters of 19-32-56 and a stroke of 36 inches for wooden steamers (188nhp)

 Nielson & Kelez, Seattle, Washington: , 
 Meacham & Babcock, Seattle: 
 Maryland Shipbuilding Co., Sollers Point, Maryland: 
 J. M. Murdock & Co., Jacksonville, Florida: 

Diameter of 19-32-56 and a stroke of 36 inches (330nhp)

 Superior Shipbuilding Company, Superior, Wisconsin: 
 Chicago Shipbuilding Company, Chicago, Illinois: 

Diameter of 21-35-59 and a stroke of 42 inches (225nhp)

Diameter of 21-35-59 and a stroke of 42 inches (307nhp)

By 1926, they were manufacturing diesel engines, steam engines (poppet-uniflow Corliss), air compressors, gas compressors, mine hoists (steam, air, and electric) and blowing engines.

In 1944, they designed and built the largest diesel engine that has ever been built in the United States. It was built for a Victory ship built for the United States Maritime Commission.

In 1946, they bought the Busch-Sulzer Diesel Engine Company which was formed in 1911 by Adolphus Busch of Anheuser-Busch Brewery. Busch had acquired the first American rights to the diesel engine in 1898.

Nordberg was acquired by Rex ChainBelt Inc (formerly Chain Belt Company) in 1970, and was to become a division of Rex. By that time, Nordberg had been manufacturing mineral and rock crushing equipment, screens, grinding mills, and hoists, heavy duty diesel and gas turbines, railroad maintenance machinery, hydraulic valves presses and other components.

Nordberg was acquired by Finland's Rauma Corporation in 1989, which was later merged into Metso in 1999.  Metso closed Nordberg's former Milwaukee factory in 2004.

List of Ships

Nordberg engines were installed on several auxiliary United States Navy ships

  (1 × TSM, 1,700shp)
  (1 × TSM6 1,750shp)
  (2 × TSM219, 6,000shp total)
  (6,000shp)

 46 of 65 C1-A
 all C1-A built by Pennsylvania Shipyards, Inc. had diesel propulsion and used 2 2,000hp 6 cylinder Nordberg engines
 the 19 other C1-A were built by Pusey & Jones with steam turbines

References

External links

 Illustrations and photographs of Nordberg factory and diesel engines from sales brochures and private sources

Engine manufacturers of the United States
Manufacturing companies established in 1886
Manufacturing companies disestablished in 2004
1886 establishments in Wisconsin
2004 disestablishments in Wisconsin
Defunct manufacturing companies based in Milwaukee

de:Nordberg Radial Engines